De Kock is a Dutch occupational surname meaning "the cook". 

The surname may refer to:

Arthur de Kock (1866–1957), South African rugby player
Charles Paul de Kock (1793–1871), French novelist
Eugene de Kock (born 1949), South African police colonel and assassin
 (1818–1881), Dutch government minister, son of Hendrik Merkus 
Gerald de Kock, South African cricket commentator
Gerhard de Kock (1926–1989), Governor of the South African Reserve Bank, son of Mike de Kock
Gert De Kock (born 1980), South African rugby player
Hendrik Merkus de Kock (1779–1845), Dutch general, minister, and governor of the Dutch East Indies
Fort de Kock on Sumatra was named after him
Henry de Kock (1819–1892), French playwright, novelist, and chansonnier, son of Charles Pal
Jean Conrad de Kock (1755–1794), Dutch banker executed in France, father of Hendrik Merkus and Charles Paul
Johan de Kock (born 1964), Dutch footballer
Kobus de Kock (born 1988), South African rugby player
Lucas Cornelisz de Kock (1495–1552), Dutch Renaissance painter active in the Tudor court 
Meyer de Kock (1849–1901), South African Republic burgher executed for treason
Michiel Hendrik de Kock (1898–1976), Governor of the South African Reserve Bank
Neil de Kock (born 1978), South African rugby player
Paul de Kock (1793–1871), French novelist
Peter de Kock (born 1967), Dutch cameraman, film producer and director
Riel de Kock (born 1983), South African cricketer
Quinton de Kock (born 1992), South African cricketer
Véronique De Kock (born 1977), Belgian beauty pageant contestant
Given name
De Kock Steenkamp (born 1987), South African rugby player

See also
De Cock
De Kok

References

Dutch-language surnames
Afrikaans-language surnames
Occupational surnames